Drago is a Bulgarian, Serbian, Slovene, Croatian male given name, usually short for the other names with the root drag- (lit. a "dear one"), such as Dragan, Dragutin, etc. The feminine version is Draga. A Romanian version is Dragoș.

Notable people bearing it include:

 Drago Bregar (1952–1977), Slovenian mountaineer
 Drago Marin Čerina (born 1949), Croatian sculpting artist
 Drago Došen (1943–2019), Serbian painter
 Drago Dumbović (born 1960), Croatian football player
 Drago Gabrić (born 1986), Croatian football player
 Drago Gervais (1904–1957), Croatian Istrian poet and playwright
 Drago Grdenić (1919–2018), Croatian chemist
 Drago Grubelnik (1976–2015), Slovenian alpine skier
 Drago Hedl (born 1950), Croatian journalist
 Drago Hmelina (1932–2004), Croatian football player
 Drago Horvat (born 1958), Slovenian ice hockey player
 Drago Husjak (1926–1987), Croatian rower
 Drago Ibler (1894–1964), Croatian architect
 Drago Jančar (born 1948), Slovenian writer
 Drago Jelić (1914–1990), Croatian gymnast
 Drago Jovanović (1916–1983), Serbian-American helicopter designer and inventor
 Drago Jovović (1954–2002), Serbian handball player
 Drago Jurak (1911–1994), Croatian painter
 Drago Karalić (born 1965), Bosnian Serb basketball coach
 Drago Kolar (1932–2000), Slovenian ceramics artist
 Drago Kovačević (1953–2019), Croatian Serb politician and writer
 Drago Lovrić (born 1961), Croatian general
 Drago Mamić (born 1954), Serbian-born Croatian football player and manager
 Drago Marušič (1884–1964), Slovenian and Yugoslav politician and jurist
 Drago Matanović, Slovenian electrical engineer
 Drago Matulaj (1911–1996), Croatian rower
 Drago Miličić, perpetrator of a 1992 mass shooting in Bosnia and Herzegovina
 Drago Milović (born 1994), Montenegrin football player
 
 Drago Nikolić (1957–2015), Bosnian Serb war criminal
 Drago Papa (born 1984), Croatian football player
 Drago Pašalić (born 1984), Croatian basketball player
 Drago Pilsel (born 1962), Argentine Croatian journalist
 Drago Prgomet (born 1965), Croatian physician and politician
 Drago Pudgar (born 1949), Slovenian ski jumper
 Drago Savić (born 1949), Slovenian ice hockey player
 Drago Siliqi (1930–1963), Albanian poet, literary critic and publisher
 Drago Supančič (1903–1964), Slovene special-needs teacher
 Drago Šoštarić (born 1943), Slovenian gymnast
 Drago Štajnberger (1916–1942), Croatian Jewish war hero
 Drago Štambuk (born 1950), Croatian physician, writer and diplomat
 Drago Štritof (1923–2014), Croatian runner
 Drago Vabec (born 1950), Croatian football player
 Drago Vuković (born 1983), Croatian handball player
 Drago Žigman (1924–1983), Croatian football player
 Drago Žiljak (born 1960), Croatian handball player and coach

See also

Drago (surname)
Dragović (surname)

References

Croatian masculine given names
Bulgarian masculine given names
Serbian masculine given names
Slovene masculine given names
Slavic masculine given names